Senja Pusula (born March 26, 1941) is a former cross-country skier from Finland who competed during the 1960s and early 1970s. She won a bronze medal in the 3 × 5 km relay at the 1964 Winter Olympics in Innsbruck.

Pusula also won a bronze medal in the 3 × 5 km relay at the 1970 FIS Nordic World Ski Championships. She also won the 5 km event at the Holmenkollen ski festival in 1968.

Cross-country skiing results
All results are sourced from the International Ski Federation (FIS).

Olympic Games
1 medal – (1 bronze)

World Championships
 1 medal – (1 bronze)

References

External links
 
  
 
 

1941 births
Living people
Cross-country skiers at the 1964 Winter Olympics
Cross-country skiers at the 1968 Winter Olympics
Cross-country skiers at the 1972 Winter Olympics
Finnish female cross-country skiers
Holmenkollen Ski Festival winners
Olympic medalists in cross-country skiing
FIS Nordic World Ski Championships medalists in cross-country skiing
Medalists at the 1964 Winter Olympics
Olympic bronze medalists for Finland
20th-century Finnish women